Chemokine (C-C motif) ligand 19 (CCL19) is a protein that in humans is encoded by the CCL19 gene.

This gene is one of several CC cytokine genes clustered on the p-arm of chromosome 9. Cytokines are a family of secreted proteins involved in immunoregulatory and inflammatory processes. The CC cytokines are proteins characterized by two adjacent cysteines. The cytokine encoded by this gene may play a role in normal lymphocyte recirculation and homing. It also plays an important role in trafficking of T cells in thymus, and in T cell and B cell migration to secondary lymphoid organs. It specifically binds to chemokine receptor CCR7.

Chemokine (C-C motif) ligand 19 (CCL19) is a small cytokine belonging to the CC chemokine family that is also known as EBI1 ligand chemokine (ELC) and macrophage inflammatory protein-3-beta (MIP-3-beta). CCL19 is expressed abundantly in thymus and lymph nodes, with moderate levels in trachea and colon and low levels in stomach, small intestine, lung, kidney and spleen. The gene for CCL19 is located on human chromosome 9. This chemokine elicits its effects on its target cells by binding to the chemokine receptor chemokine receptor CCR7. It attracts certain cells of the immune system, including dendritic cells and antigen-engaged B cells, CCR7+ central-memory T-Cells.

References

Further reading

External links
 

Cytokines